The 1930 PGA Championship was the 13th PGA Championship, held September 8–13 in New York City at Fresh Meadow Country Club in Flushing, Queens. Then a match play championship, Tommy Armour defeated Gene Sarazen 1 up in the finals for the second of his three major titles.

Johnny Farrell and Horton Smith were co-medalists at 145 (+5) in the 36-hole stroke play qualifier on Monday. Two-time defending champion Leo Diegel lost in the second round to Harold Sampson in 38 holes, ending his bid for a third straight title. Runner-up Sarazen was the club pro at Fresh Meadow; he previously won the PGA Championship in 1922 and 1923.

During the 36-hole Monday qualifier, Diegel shot 81 in the morning round and was in danger of not advancing to match play.  He followed up with a 69 (–1) in the afternoon and his 150 (+10) put him only five strokes behind the medalists, in a tie for 8th place, easily within the top 32. Starting in 1931, the defending champion was exempt from qualifying.

The course where this PGA Championship was played in Queens no longer exists. Designed by A. W. Tillinghast, it opened in 1923 and also hosted the U.S. Open in 1932, won by Sarazen. Under increasing development and tax pressure, the Fresh Meadow Country Club sold the property in 1946, which was developed as a residential neighborhood (the Fresh Meadows section of Queens). The club then purchased the property, clubhouse, and golf course of the defunct Lakeville Golf & Country Club in Lake Success, its current home.

Format
The match play format at the PGA Championship in 1930 called for 12 rounds (216 holes) in six days:
 Monday – 36-hole stroke play qualifier
top 32 professionals advanced to match play
 Tuesday – first round – 36 holes 
 Wednesday – second round – 36 holes 
 Thursday – quarterfinals – 36 holes 
 Friday – semifinals – 36 holes 
 Saturday – final – 36 holes

Past champions in the field

Failed to qualify

Barnes, Hagen, and Hutchison did not advance past sectional qualifying
Source:

Final results
Saturday, September 13, 1930

Final eight bracket

Final match scorecards
Morning

Afternoon

Source:

References

External links
PGA Media Guide 2012
PGA.com – 1930 PGA Championship

PGA Championship
Golf in New York (state)
Sports in Long Island
Flushing, Queens
PGA Championship
PGA Championship
PGA Championship
PGA Championship